This article lists political parties in Sint Maarten.

Sint Maarten has a multi-party system with numerous political parties, in which usually a single party does not have a chance of gaining power alone, and thus parties must work with each other to form coalition governments. Political parties tend to be loose political groupings, rather than supporting a consistent ideology, and as such, in the 2010s there were several instances of members of parties leaving to become unaffiliated, leading to the collapse of several coalition governments and snap elections.

Parties

Parties represented in Parliament

Other parties 

Democratic Party (Democratische Partij Sint Maarten)
People's Progressive Alliance
Citizens for Positive Change (4 Positive Change)
Social Reform Party (SRP)
Concordia Political Alliance (CPA)
One St. Maarten People Party (OSPP)
St. Maarten Christian Party (SMCP)

References

See also
 List of political parties by country

Sint Maarten
 
+Sint Maarten
Sint Maarten
Political parties
Political parties